Gat mort is a left tributary of the Garonne, in southwest France.

Geography

Department and towns
Gat mort flows through the following department and towns:
Gironde  (33) : Hostens, Saint-Magne, Louchats, Cabanac-et-Villagrains, Saint-Morillon, Saint-Selve, Castres-Gironde, Beautiran.

References

Rivers of France
Rivers of Gironde
Rivers of Nouvelle-Aquitaine